Bombs & Butterflies is the fifth studio album by the Athens, Georgia-based band Widespread Panic. The band started recording the album in July 1996 at John Keane's studio in Athens. The band held a CD release party at Morton Theatre in Athens, one day prior to their Fox Theatre New Year's Eve run on December 28, 1996. It was first released by Capricorn Records on February 4, 1997. It would later be re-released in 2001 by Zomba Music Group.

On June 19, 1997, the band performed "Aunt Avis" on Late Night with Conan O'Brien. Two days later, on June 21, the music video for "Aunt Avis", directed by Billy Bob Thornton, premiered on VH1. The video had been filmed in April 1997 and featured Athens singer-songwriter Vic Chesnutt, who wrote the song.

The album reached a peak position of #50 on the Billboard 200 chart. The track "Hope in a Hopeless World" was a hit on rock radio, charting at #13 on the Billboard Mainstream Rock Tracks in 1997. It is the band's biggest hit to date.

Track listing 
All tracks by Widespread Panic
 "Radio Child"  – 4:21
 "Aunt Avis" (Vic Chesnutt)  – 3:26
 "Tall Boy"  – 4:24
 "Gradle"  – 4:23
 "Glory"  – 3:45
 "Rebirtha"  – 7:19
 "You Got Yours"  – 5:25
 "Hope in a Hopeless World" (Bob Thiele Jr. / Phil Roy)  – 5:15
 "Happy"  – 4:56
 "Greta"  – 6:06

Personnel 

 John Bell - guitar, vocals
 Michael Houser - guitar, vocals
 Todd Nance - percussion, drums, vocals
 Domingo S. Ortiz - percussion
 Dave Schools - bass, percussion, vocals
 John Hermann - keyboards

Production 
 Chad Brown - mixing assistant
 Vic Chesnutt - vocals
 John Keane - guitar, pedal steel, producer, engineer, mixing
 Clif Norrell - mixing
 Diane Painter - art direction, design
 John Ritter - design, illustrations
 Nitin Vakukul - photography

References

External links 
 Widespread Panic website
 Everyday Companion
 PanicStream 
 [ All Music entry]

1997 albums
Capricorn Records albums
Widespread Panic albums
Albums produced by John Keane (record producer)